La Epoca (Ladino: The Era) was a Ladino language newspaper published between 1875 and 1911 in Thessaloniki⁩, Ottoman Empire. Published nearly for forty years it was the leading Ladino publication in the Empire and first Ladino newspaper in Thessaloniki.

History and profile
La Epoca was launched by Sadi Levy in 1875, and the first issue appeared on 1 November that year. He also served as the publisher and editor-in-chief of the paper until 1888. He also published a French language newspaper entitled Le Journal de Salonique. The subtitle of La Epoca was Revista comerciala y literaria (Ladino: Commercial and literary newspaper), and the paper had a progressive and avant-garde stance. Its supporter was Alliance Israélite Universelle, a Jewish organization. La Epoca targeted the Sephardi Jews living in Thessaloniki and other towns who could only read Ladino materials.

Following the death of Sadi Levy his son, Samuel, became the editor and publisher of La Epoca. The newspaper was first published on a daily basis, and then, its frequency was switched to weekly. One of the contributors was Mercado Joseph Covo. La Epoca and its sister newspaper Le Journal de Salonique both supported Zionism, socialism and Ottomanism. In 1892 La Epoca praised the Ottomans for offering them a land after their expulsion from Spain and described the Empire as the "land where we are eating free bread." Following the Young Turk revolution in 1908 both La Epoca and Le Journal de Salonique focused more on Zionism.

La Epoca folded in 1911. The paper was archived by the National Library of Israel.

References

External links

1875 establishments in the Ottoman Empire
1911 disestablishments in the Ottoman Empire
Defunct newspapers published in the Ottoman Empire
Defunct weekly newspapers
Jewish newspapers
Newspapers published in Thessaloniki
Newspapers established in 1875
Publications disestablished in 1911
Judaeo-Spanish-language newspapers
Socialism in the Ottoman Empire
Weekly newspapers published in Greece
Zionism in the Ottoman Empire
Daily newspapers published in Greece
Socialist newspapers
Jews and Judaism in Thessaloniki